The San Diego County Sheriff's Department (SDSD), is the primary and largest law enforcement agency in San Diego County, California, and one of the largest sheriff's departments in the United States: with over 4,000 employees, an annual budget of over $960 million, and a service area over 4,500 square miles extending to a 60-mile international border. The department, established in 1850, has over 4,000 sworn deputies and additional civilian support personnel servicing an area of nearly 4,526 mi².

The SDSD provides general law enforcement and public safety services to all unincorporated areas of the county (traffic enforcement, accidents, and other traffic related issues are handled by the California Highway Patrol).

Nine incorporated cities within the county (Del Mar, Encinitas, Imperial Beach, Lemon Grove, Poway, San Marcos, Santee, Solana Beach, and Vista) contract with the department for municipal law enforcement and public safety services. Within these cities, traffic enforcement is also provided.

The department operates and provides detention facilities (jails), court services, and specialized regional services (such as air support, search and rescue, SWAT, etc.) to all of the county and the nine contract cities.

The Wireless Services Division is responsible for the day-to-day operations of the San Diego County-Imperial County Regional Communications System (RCS).

The sheriff is elected by the voters of San Diego County. The current sheriff is William Gore, who was appointed by the Board of Supervisors in 2009 when Bill Kolender resigned, and then was elected to a full term in June 2010.

Organization

Office of the Sheriff
 Public Affairs
 Intergovernmental Legislative Affairs
 Legal Affairs
 Senior Executive Assistant
Division of Inspectional Services

Service bureaus
The San Diego County Sheriff's Department is organized into five service bureaus: Law Enforcement Services, Detention Facility Services, Court Services, Human Resource Services, and Management Services. Each bureau is managed by an Assistant Sheriff except the Management Services Bureau, which is headed by an Executive Director.

Law Enforcement Services Bureau
 Major Crimes Division
 Central Operations Detail
 Computer And Technology Crime High-tech Response Team (CATCH)
 Elder Abuse
 Financial Crimes
 Homicide Detail
 Family Protection Detail
 Domestic Violence
 Sex Offender Management Unit
 Child Abuse Unit
 Communications Division
 Communications Center
 Emergency Services Division
 Arson/Explosives
 ASTREA (air support unit)
Dive Unit (Search and Recovery)
 Reserves
 Search and Rescue
 Special Enforcement Detail (SED)/SWAT
 Special Investigations Division
 Intelligence
 Narcotics
 Public Inspections
 Street Gang/Narcotics

Patrol Stations, Substations and Field Offices

4S Ranch Substation
10282 Rancho Bernardo Rd
San Diego, CA 92127

Alpine Station
2751 Alpine Blvd
Alpine, CA 91901

Borrego Springs Office
571 Palm Canyon Dr.
Borrego Springs, CA 92004

Boulevard/Jacumba Substation 
39919 Highway 94
Boulevard, CA 91905

Campo/Tecate Substation
378 Sheridan Rd
Campo, CA 91906

North Coastal Station (formerly Encinitas Station)
175 N. El Camino Real
Encinitas, CA 92024

Fallbrook Substation
388 East Alvarado St
Fallbrook, CA 92028

Imperial Beach Station
845 Imperial Beach Blvd
Imperial Beach, CA 91932

Lakeside Substation
12365 Parkside St. 
Lakeside, CA 92040

Julian Substation
2907 Washington St, Bldg C
Julian, CA 92036

Lemon Grove Substation
3240 Main St
Lemon Grove, CA 91945

Pine Valley Substation
28914 Old Highway 80, #106
Pine Valley, CA 91962

Poway Station
13100 Bowron Rd
Poway, CA 92064

Ramona Substation
1424 Montecito Rd
Ramona, CA 92065

Rancho San Diego Station
11486 Campo Rd.
Spring Valley, CA 91978

Ranchita Office
25704 San Felipe Rd, S-2
Warner Springs, CA 92086

San Marcos Station
182 Santar Pl
San Marcos, CA 92069

Santee Station
8811 Cuyamaca St
Santee, CA 92071

Valley Center Substation
28201 N. Lake Wohlford Rd
Valley Center, CA 92082

Vista Station
325 S. Melrose, Ste 210
Vista, CA 92081

Court Services Bureau

Detention Services Bureau
 San Diego Central Jail (SDCJ)
 George Bailey Detention Facility (GBDF)
 East Mesa Reentry Facility (EMRF)
 Las Colinas Women's Detention Facility (LCDF)
 South Bay Detention Facility (SBDF)
 Vista Detention Facility (VDF)
 Facility 8 (FAC8)

Human Resource Services Bureau
 Personnel Division
 Background Investigations Unit
 Career Path Assessment Unit
 Recruiting Unit
 Professional Standards Division
 Internal Affairs Unit
 Risk Management Unit
 Training Division
 Detentions and Court Services Academy
 In-Service Training Unit
 Regional Basic Academy
 Weapons Training Unit (Range)

Management Services Bureau
 Data Services Division
 Wireless Services Division
 Contracts Division
 Fiscal Services

Vehicles

Over the years, the sheriff's office's marked vehicles have sported unusual paint schemes. Originally in a traditional black and white, they transitioned to a pink-salmon color in the 1960s. From 1971 to 1991 the vehicles were painted kelly green-and-white which were the campaign colors of Sheriff John F. Duffy. When he retired the fleet was returned to the black-and-white color scheme and has remained so ever since. The department has also had a few all-white cars over the years, but these were for Traffic Enforcement and Volunteer Patrols only.

Today, the San Diego County Sheriff's Department utilizes the Ford Explorer as their base model for their fleet.

The SDSD also operates the Following Aircraft: 
Hughes 500, Bell 205, and Bell 407.

Weapons
Glock 17 - Standard issue handgun equipped with a Streamlight TLR-1.
Glock 22 .40 S&W- previously standard issue, being phased out.
Glock 23 .40 S&W- used by detectives and other investigators, some regular deputies carry it as well as an off duty weapon. 
Glock 27 .40 S&W- backup gun for deputies, used by some investigators as well as an off duty weapon for some deputies. 
Colt CAR-15A1/A2- R6520 variant used as a patrol rifle for deputies as is the R0603 (M16A1) variant can also be seen in patrol vehicles. 
Remington 870 12 gauge- standard issue shotgun for deputies, is a pump-action shotgun.
Springfield Armory M-14- used for certain situations, is not the standard issue rifle but the SDSD does have a few M-14's in the agency's inventory.

Sheriffs

 Agoston Haraszthy, 1850–1851
 George F. Hooper, 1852–1853
 William Conroy, 1853–1854
 M. M. Sexton, 1854–1855
 Joseph Reiner, 1856–1857
 D. A. Hollister, 1857–1858
 George Lyons, 1858–1861
 James McCoy, 1862–1871
 Samuel W. Craigue, 1871–1874
 Nicholas Hunsaker, 1875–1876
 Joseph Coyne, 1876–1882
 Edward W. Bushyhead, 1883–1886
 Samuel A. McDowell, 1887–1890
 John H. Folks, 1891–1892
 Ben P. Hill, 1893–1894
 Frank S. Jennings, 1895–1902
 Thomas W. Brodnax, 1903–1906 
 Fred M. Jennings, 1907–1914 
 Ralph Conklin, 1915–1918
 James C. Byers, 1918–1929
 Edgar F. Cooper, 1929–1935
 Ernest W. Dort, 1936–1941
 Bert Strand, 1941–1962
 Elmer Jansen, 1962–1963
 Joseph C. O'Connor, 1963–1971
 John F. Duffy, 1971–1991
 Jim Roache, 1991–1995
 William B. Kolender 1995-2009
 William D. Gore 2009–2022

Deputies killed in line of duty
 Andrew Kriss, May 25, 1864, gunfire
 Will Ward, November 27, 1899, assault
 Thomas A. Fay, May 17, 1919, gunfire
 Donn G. Witt, September 25, 1983, illness
 Kelly Ann Bazer, January 13, 1986, gunfire
 Lonny Gene Brewer, December 5, 1987, gunfire
 Theodore L. Beckmann Jr., February 8, 1989, vehicular assault
 Patrick Steven Coyle, February 16, 1997, aircraft accident
 Ken Collier, February 28, 2010, vehicle pursuit

Rank structure

History

The San Diego Sheriff department was formed in 1850, and since then it has served a diverse county consisting of many constituents with competing interests. San Diego Sheriff's department was a co-appellant in the Supreme Court of the United States and Ninth Circuit cases Kolender v. Lawson, 461 U.S. 352 (1983), which held unconstitutional laws that allow law enforcement to demand that "loiterers" and "wanderers" provide identification; this continues to affect other departments nationwide.

See also

 David Myers (police officer)
 List of law enforcement agencies in California

References

External links
 San Diego County Sheriff's Department Official Website
 San Diego County Sheriff's Official Recruiting Website
 San Diego County Honorary Deputy Sheriff's Association
 San Diego Sheriff's Museum
 County of San Diego Official Website

Sheriffs' departments of California
Government of San Diego County, California
Organizations based in San Diego County, California
Government agencies established in 1850
1850 establishments in California